Sobiech is a surname of Polish origin. It may refer to: 

 Artur Sobiech (born 1990), Polish footballer
 Bogna Sobiech (born 1990), Polish handball player
 Jörg Sobiech (born 1969), German footballer
 Lasse Sobiech (born 1991), German footballer
 Zach Sobiech (1995–2013), American pop singer

See also

References

Polish-language surnames